Joel Michael Stroetzel (born July 24, 1980) is best known as the rhythm guitarist from the Massachusetts metalcore band Killswitch Engage.

Background
Stroetzel attended the Berklee College of Music in Boston but did not graduate. Stroetzel's guitar style is influenced by the bands Slayer, Anthrax, Zakk Wylde, as stated on the World Ablaze DVD.

Career
While at college, Stroetzel began playing in the band Aftershock. The band broke up in 1999, when Joel formed Killswitch Engage with co-guitarist Adam Dutkiewicz. Joel plays the guitar solo in the track "Holy Diver" and is seen occasionally singing during live renditions of "The End of Heartache".

Stroetzel has also performed with the band Times of Grace as a touring musician.

Equipment

Stroetzel has used a wide variety of guitars and amps throughout his career, including the Mesa Boogie Roadster and Triple Rectifier heads, a Marshall JCM900, a modified Soldano SLO-100, and a Hughes and Kettner TriAmp MKII, which he did not like for metal because he said it "didn't hold together well." He has also used the Framus Cobra and Dragon, the Peavey 5150, the Splawn Nitro, the Diezel VH4, and the Fuchs Viper for distorted tones, and the Fender Twin '65 Reverb and Vox AC30 for clean tones. He is currently endorsed by Laney Amplification, used their Ironheart series of amplifiers and currently using Tony Iommi's signature amplifier TI-100.

Joel is endorsed by Caparison Guitars and uses the Caparison Dellinger, Horus, TAT, and Angelus models. Caparison produces the Dellinger-JSM – Joel Stroetzel Signature Model. It has a Caparison Fixed Bridge and through body stringing, with Fishman Fluence Killswitch Engage Signature pickups, a walnut top, mahogany back, and a 5-piece maple and walnut neck. It is the first Caparison guitar to have a pick guard. He also had another signature model which is similar to an Angelus, but with a narrower body and longer horns, somewhat a cross between a TAT Special and an Angelus.

In his current live amp rig, he uses both Laney amps, making use of a Laney Iommi head with a Celestion Vintage 30-loaded Laney Iommi 4x12 cabinet for his distorted tones, and a Laney Lionheart 1x12 combo for clean tones.

For his current live effects rig, he makes use of a Maxon OD808 Overdrive, Maxon AD-9 delay, Maxon CP-9 Pro+ compressor, Boss Corporation NS-2 Noise Suppressor, Boss ABY switcher, Jet City JetDirect DI box, and a Korg DTR2000 tuner. For wireless, he uses an Audio-Technica 5000 Series.

He currently uses D'Addario EXL115 (.011–.049) strings and Planet Waves Black Ice 1.10mm picks.

Discography

Aftershock

 Through the Looking Glass (2000) – Guitar

Killswitch Engage

 Killswitch Engage (2000)
 Alive or Just Breathing (2002)
 The End of Heartache (2004)
 As Daylight Dies (2006)
 Killswitch Engage (2009)
 Disarm the Descent (2013)
 Incarnate (2016)
 Atonement (2019)

References

External links

 Joel Stroetzel's 2005 Killswitch Engage guitar rig from GuitarGeek.Com

1980 births
Living people
American people of German descent
American heavy metal guitarists
Berklee College of Music alumni
Rhythm guitarists
American male guitarists
Killswitch Engage members
Aftershock (band) members
21st-century American guitarists
21st-century American male musicians
Times of Grace members